The Art Deco style, which originated in France just before World War I, had an important impact on architecture and design in the United States in the 1920s and 1930s.  The most famous examples are the skyscrapers of New York City including the Empire State Building, Chrysler Building, and Rockefeller Center. It combined modern aesthetics, fine craftsmanship and expensive materials, and became the symbol of luxury and modernity. While rarely used in residences, it was frequently used for office buildings, government buildings, train stations, movie theaters, diners and department stores. It also was frequently used in furniture, and in the design of automobiles, ocean liners, and everyday objects such as toasters and radio sets.  In the late 1930s, during the Great Depression, it featured prominently in the architecture of the immense public works projects sponsored by the Works Progress Administration and the Public Works Administration, such as the Golden Gate Bridge and Hoover Dam.  The style competed throughout the period with the modernist architecture, and came to an abrupt end in 1939 with the beginning of World War II.  The style was rediscovered in the 1960s, and many of the original buildings have been restored and are now historical landmarks.

Background
American Art Deco has roots in the style moderne popularized at the 1925 International Exhibition of Modern Decorative and Industrial Arts, Paris, from which the name Art Deco would be drawn retroactively (Exposition internationale des arts décoratifs et industriels modernes). The United States did not officially participate, but Americans—including New York City architect Irwin Chanin and others—visited the exposition, and the government sent a delegation to the expo. Their resulting reports helped spread the style to America. Other influences included German expressionism, the Austrian Secession, art nouveau, cubism, and the ornament of African and Central and South American cultures.

Architecture
American Art Deco architecture took different forms in different regions of the country, influenced by the local tastes, cultural influences, or laws. In the 1920s, the style was often referred to as the "vertical style", referring to the new look of skyscrapers appearing in America's cities. In the 1930s and 40s, more horizontal, streamlined or "moderne" buildings became popular. Government buildings commissioned by the Works Progress Administration, with their fusion of moderne and classical elements, are called "WPA Moderne" or "Modern classic".

Skyscrapers

The Art Deco style had been born in Paris, but no buildings were permitted in that city which were higher than Notre Dame Cathedral (with the sole exception of the Eiffel Tower).  As a result, the United States soon took the lead in building tall buildings. The first skyscrapers had been built in Chicago in the 1880s in the Beaux-Arts or neoclassical style. In the 1920s, New York architects used the new Art Deco style to build the Chrysler Building and the Empire State Building.  The Empire State building was the tallest building in the world for forty years.

The decoration of the interior and exterior of the skyscrapers was classic Art Deco, with geometric shapes and zigzag patterns. The Chrysler Building, by William Van Alen (1928–30), updated the traditional gargoyles on Gothic cathedrals with sculptures on the building corners in the shape of Chrysler radiator ornaments.

Another major landmark of the style was the RCA Victor Building (now the General Electric Building), by John Walter Cross.  It was covered from top to bottom with zig-zags and geometric patterns, and had a highly ornamental crown with geometric spires and lightning bolts of stone. The exterior featured bas-relief sculptures by Leo Friedlander and Lee Lawrie, and a mosaic by Barry Faulkner that required more than a million pieces of enamel and glass.

While the skyscraper Art Deco style was mostly used for corporate office buildings, it also became popular for government buildings, since all city offices could be contained in one building on a minimal amount of land. The city halls of Los Angeles, California and Buffalo, New York were built in the style, as well as the new capital building of the State of Louisiana.

Movie theaters

Another important genre of Art Deco buildings is the movie theater. The Art Deco period coincided with the birth of the talking motion picture, and the age of enormous and lavishly decorated movie theaters.  Many of these movie theaters still survive, though many have been divided in the interior into smaller screening halls.

Among the most famous examples are the Paramount Theatre in Oakland, California, which had a four-story high grand lobby, entered through twenty-seven doors, and could seat 3,746 people.

Radio City Music Hall, located within the skyscraper complex of Rockefeller Center in New York City, was originally a theater for stage shows when it opened in 1932, but it quickly changed to the largest movie theater in the United States. It seats more than five thousand people, and still features a stage show of dancers.

In the 1930s, the streamline style appeared in movie theaters in smaller cities.  The movie theater in Normal, Illinois (1937) is a classic surviving example.

Department stores and office buildings

Following the lead of the skyscrapers of New York City, smaller in scale but no less ambitious in design, Art Deco office buildings and department stores appeared in cities across the United States. They were rarely built by banks, which wanted to appear conservative, but were often built by retail chains, public utilities, automobile companies and technology companies, which wanted to express modernity and progress. Syracuse, New York is home to the Niagara Mohawk Building, in Syracuse, New York, completed in 1932. was originally the home of the nation's largest electricity supplier. The facade, by the firm of Bley and Lyman, was designed to express the power and modernity of electricity; it features a statue called "The Spirit of Light" 8.5 meters high, made of stainless steel, as the central element of the facade.  The Guardian Building, originally the Union Trust Building, is a rare example of a bank or financial institution using Art Deco. Its interior decoration was so elaborate that it became known as the "Cathedral of Commerce". 

The San Francisco architect Timothy L. Pflueger best known for the Paramount Theatre in Oakland, California, was another proponent of lavish Art Deco interiors and facades on office buildings. The interior of his downtown San Francisco office building, 450 Sutter Street, opened in 1929, was entirely covered with hieroglyphic-like designs and ornament, resembling a giant tapestry.

The Streamline style

Streamline Moderne (or Streamline) was a variety of Art Deco which emerged during the mid-1930s. The architectural style was more sober and less decorative than earlier Art Deco buildings, more in tune with the somber mood of the Great Depression. Notable examples include the San Francisco Maritime Museum (1936), originally built as a public bath house next to the beach, and the Pan-Pacific Auditorium in Los Angeles, built in 1935 and closed in 1978. It was declared a historic landmark, but it was destroyed by a fire in 1989.

The style of decoration and industrial design was influenced by modern aerodynamic principles developed for aviation and ballistics to reduce air friction at high velocities.  The bullet shapes were applied by designers to cars, trains, ships, and even objects not intended to move, such as refrigerators, gas pumps, and buildings.  One of the first production vehicles in this style was the Chrysler Airflow of 1933. It was unsuccessful commercially, but the beauty and functionality of its design set a precedent; streamline moderne meant modernity. It continued to be used in car design well after World War II.

Train stations and airports

Art Deco was often associated with airplanes, trains and airships and was frequently chosen as the style for new transport terminals. After the decline of railroad travel, most of the building was converted to other uses, including the Cincinnati Museum Center, though it is still used as an Amtrak station.

The Marine Air Terminal at LaGuardia Airport, built in 1939, was the first terminal for overseas flights from New York; it served the flying boats of Pan American World Airways which landed in the harbor. It survived destruction, and still contains a notable Art Deco mural called Flight, which was destroyed and then restored in the 1980s.

Union Station in Los Angeles was partially designed by John Parkinson and Donald B. Parkinson (the Parkinsons) who had also designed Los Angeles City Hall and other landmark Los Angeles buildings. The structure combines Art Deco, Mission Revival, and Streamline Moderne style, with architectural details such as eight-pointed stars, and even elements of Dutch Colonial Revival architecture.

Hotels, resorts, and the Miami Beach style

The Art Deco period saw an enormous increase in travel and tourism, by trains, automobiles, and airplanes.  Several luxury hotels were built in the new style; the Waldorf-Astoria on Park Avenue in New York City, built in 1929 to replace a beaux-arts style building from the 1890s, was the tallest and largest hotel in the world when it was built.

The city of Miami Beach, Florida developed its own particular variant of Art Deco, and the style remained popular there until the late 1940s, well after other American cities. It became a popular tourist destination in the 1920s and 1930s, particularly attracting visitors from the Northeast United States during the winter. A large number of Art Deco hotels were built, which have been grouped together into an historical area, the Miami Beach Architectural District, and preserved, and many have been restored to their original appearance.  The district has an area of about one square kilometer, and contains both hotels and secondary residences, all about the same height, none higher than twelve or thirteen stories. Most have classic Art Deco characteristics; clear geometric shapes spread out horizontally; aerodynamic streamline features; and often a central tower breaking the horizontal, topped by a spire or dome. A particular Miami Art Deco feature is the palette of pastel colors, alternating with white stucco.  The decoration features herons, sea shells, palm trees and sunrises and sunsets.  The neon lighting at night highlights the Art Deco atmosphere.

Diners and roadside architecture

Because of its high cost of construction, Art Deco was usually used only in large office buildings, government buildings and theaters, but it was sometimes used in smaller structures, such as diners and gas stations, particularly along highways. A notable example is the U-Drop Inn in Shamrock, Texas, located along U.S. Highway 66. It was built in 1936, and is now owned by the City of Shamrock, and is an historical landmark.

In the late 1930s and early 1940s, a number of diners modeled after the cars of streamlined trains were produced, and appeared in different cities in the United States.  In a few cases, real railroad cars were transformed into diners.  A few survive, including the Modern Diner in Pawtucket, Rhode Island which is a registered landmark.

Fine art

Murals

There was no specific Art Deco style of painting in the United States, though paintings were often used as decoration, especially in government buildings and office buildings. In the 1932 the Public Works of Art Project was created to give work to artists unemployed because the Great Depression. In a year, it commissioned more than fifteen thousand works of art. It was succeeded in 1935 by the Federal Arts Project of the Works Progress Administration, or WPA. prominent American artists were commissioned by the Federal Art Project to paint murals in government buildings, hospitals, airports, schools and universities.  Some the America's most famous artists, including Grant Wood, Reginald Marsh, Georgia O'Keeffe and Maxine Albro took part in the program. The celebrated Mexican painter Diego Rivera also took part in the program, painting a mural. The paintings were in a variety of styles, including regionalism, social realism, and American scenic painting.

A few murals were also commissioned for Art Deco skyscrapers, notably Rockefeller Center in New York. Two murals were commissioned for the lobby, one by John Steuart Curry and another, Man at the Crossroads, by Diego Rivera. The owners of the building, the Rockefeller family, discovered that Rivera, a Communist, had slipped an image of Lenin into a crowd in the painting, and had it destroyed. The mural was replaced with another by the Spanish artist José Maria Sert.

Sculpture

One of the largest Art Deco sculptures is the statue of Ceres, the goddess of grain and fertility, at the top of the Chicago Board of Trade. Made of aluminum, it stands 31 feet (9.4 meters) tall, and weighs 6,500 pounds. Ceres was chosen because the Chicago Board of Trade was one of the largest grain and commodities markets in the world.

Graphic arts

The Art Deco style appeared early in the graphic arts, in the years just before World War I. It appeared in Paris in the posters and the costume designs of Léon Bakst for the Ballets Russes, and in the catalogs of the fashion designers Paul Poiret. The illustrations of Georges Barbier, and Georges Lepape and the images in the fashion magazine La Gazette du bon ton perfectly captured the elegance and sensuality of the style. In the 1920s, the look changed; the fashions stressed were more casual, sportive and daring, with the woman models usually smoking cigarettes. American fashion magazines such as Vogue, Vanity Fair and Harper's Bazaar quickly picked up the new style and popularized it in the United States.  It also influenced the work of American book illustrators such as Rockwell Kent.

In the 1930s a new genre of posters appeared in the United States during the Great Depression.  The Federal Art Project hired American artists to create posters to promote tourism and cultural events.

PWA Moderne 

Government and public buildings of the 30s and 40s often combined elements of neoclassical, Beauxs-Arts, and Art Deco. This style is called PWA Moderne, Federal Moderne, Depression Moderne, Classical Moderne, Stripped Classicism, or Greco Deco. These building-scale New Deal artworks were built during and shortly after the Great Depression as part of relief projects sponsored by the Public Works Administration (PWA) and the Works Progress Administration (WPA).

The style draws from traditional motifs such as Beaux-Arts classicism and Art Deco and is similar to Streamline Moderne, often with zigzag ornamentation added. The structures reflect a greater use of conservative and classical elements and have a monumental feel. They include post offices, train stations, public schools, libraries, civic centers, courthouses, museums, bridges, and dams across the country. Banks were also built in the style because such buildings radiated authority. The architecture frequently expressed itself in a rather severe Greco-Roman facade decorated with deco styles shallow reliefs and/or deco styled interior decoration featuring murals, tile mosaics and sculpture. A common motif among this architecture is the use of stylized or simplified pilasters.

Elements of the style 
Typical elements of PWA Moderne buildings include:
Classical balanced and symmetrical form
Windows arranged as vertical recessed panels
Surfaces sheathed in smooth, flat stone or stucco

Examples 
Examples of PWA buildings and structures include:

Arizona/Nevada
Hoover Dam (Boulder Dam) – on the Colorado River in Arizona and Nevada.
 Arizona State Fairgrounds Grandstand (1936–1937) – Phoenix, Arizona. The exterior of the grandstand has 23 bas-relief panels by David Carrick Swing and Florence Blakeslee, that were funded by the Federal Art Project.
WPA Administration Building (1938) – at 19th Avenue and McDowell Road on the Arizona State Fairgrounds, Phoenix, Arizona. It was headquarters for Works Progress Administration−WPA projects in Arizona.

Florida

Jacksonville
Ed Austin Building (former Federal Courthouse, current State Attorney's Office), 1933, Marsh & Saxelbye

California

Greater Los Angeles

Burbank: Burbank City Hall, Allen Lutzi
El Segundo: El Segundo Elementary School, 1936
Hermosa Beach: North School, 1934 Samuel Lunden (Per File #19-45 of DSA Records); Pier Avenue School, 1939, March, Smith, and Powell
Inglewood: Inglewood Memorial Park, buildings 1933 and 1940, Walter E. Erkes
Lancaster: Post Office (1940, Louis A. Simon and former School Building (c. 1937)
Lawndale: Leuzinger High School, T.C. Kistner & Cómo.; Kistner & Curtis; Eugene D. Birnbaum and Associates
Long Beach
Jefferson Junior High School Building, 1936
Long Beach Main Post Office, 1934, Louis A. Simon and James A. Wetmore
Municipal Utilities Building, 1932, Dedrick and Bobbe
Robert Louis Stevenson school, c. 1936
Veteran's Memorial Building 1936–37, George Kahrs
Los Angeles:
Abraham Lincoln High School (Lincoln Heights), 1937–38, Albert C. Martin
Carpenter Community Charter School
Distribution Station #28, Department of Water and Power (West L.A.), 1945–46, G. E. Benker, engineer
Federal Building and Post Office (now U.S. Federal Courthouse), 1938–1940, Louis A. Simon
Hall of Administration, 1956–1961: A continuation of the PWA Moderne style in the 1950s
Hollywood Branch Post Office, 1937, Claude Beellman, Allison and Allison
Pacific Stock Exchange, 1929–30, Samuel E. Lunden
Police and Fire Station of Venice, c. 1930
San Pedro High School, 1935–1937, Gordon B. Kaufmann
Sepulveda Dam, 1941, flood control dam on the Los Angeles River in the San Fernando Valley, 1939–1941, War Department
U.S. Customs House and Post Office (San Pedro), 1935
U.S. Naval and Marine Corps Armory, 1939–40, Stiles Clements
University of Southern California campus: Alan Hancock Foundation and Memorial Museum, 1940, Cram and Ferguson
Pasadena:
Armory Gallery (former California State Armory), 1932, Bennett and Haskell
Grover Cleveland Elementary School, 1934
San Gabriel: San Gabriel Union Church and School, 1936
Santa Monica:
Santa Monica City Hall, 1938–39, Donald B. Parkinson and J. M. Estep
Post Office, Robert Dennis Murray, Louis A. Simon
Torrance:
Auditorium (Torrance High School)
Torrance Public Library, 1936, Walker & Eisen
Whittier:
National Trust and Savings, c. 1935, William H. Harrison
Whittier Post Office, 1935, Louis A. Simon
Whittier-Union High School, 1939–40, William H. Harrison

Elsewhere in California

Bakersfield: Kern County Hall of Records, 1939 remodel, Chris Brewer
Fresno: County Hall of Records, 1937, Allied Architects of Fresno
Jackson: Amador County Courthouse, 1940 remodel, George Sellon
Oakland: Alameda County Courthouse, 1939
Salinas: Monterey County Courthouse, 1937, Robert Stanton & Charles Butner
San Diego: San Diego County Administration Center, 1938, Samuel Wood Hamill, William Templeton Johnson, Richard Requa, Louis John Gill
San Francisco: San Francisco Mint, 1937
San Luis Obispo: San Luis Obispo County Courthouse, 1940, Walker & Eisen
Santa Cruz: Santa Cruz Civic Auditorium, 1939
Visalia: Tulare County Courthouse (now Department of Public Social Services), 1935, Ernest Kump

District of Columbia (Washington, D.C.)

Folger Shakespeare Library, 1932, Paul Philippe Cret
Library of Congress Annex (John Adams Building), 1939, Pierson & Wilson
Harry S Truman Building (particularly the War Department building) of the United States Department of State, 1939, Underwood & Foster

Iowa

Animosa: Jones County Courthouse, 1937, Dougher, Rich and Woodburn
Audubon: Audubon County Court House, 1940, Keffer and Jones
Atlantic: Cass County Courthouse, 1934, Dougher, Rich and Woodburn
Burlington: Des Moines County Court House, 1940, Keffer and Jones
Charles City: Floyd County Court House, 1940, Hansen & Waggoner
Dakota City: Humboldt County Courthouse, 1939
Independence: Buchanan County Court House, 1940, Dougher, Rich and Woodburn
Indianola: Warren County Court House, 1939, Keffer and Jones
Mason City: Mason City Engine House No. 2, 1939, Hansen & Waggoner
St. Olaf: St. Olaf Auditorium, 1939
Sioux City: Sioux City Municipal Auditorium, 1938–50, Knute E. Westerlind
Waukon: Allamakee County Court House, 1940, Charles Altfillisch
Waverly: Bremer County Court House, 1937, Mortimer Cleveland

Minnesota

Minneapolis: Minneapolis Armory, 1935–36, P.C. Bettenburg; Walter H. Wheeler

Mississippi
Mississippi: Amory National Guard Armory, 1937–38, Overstreet & Town

Nevada
Pioche: Lincoln County Courthouse, 1938, A. Lacy Worswick; L.F. Dow

Oregon 
 Salem: Oregon State Capitol, 1938,  Trowbridge & Livingston

Tennessee
Nashville: Martin Luther King Magnet at Pearl High School

Texas
Austin: Heman Marion Sweatt Travis County Courthouse 1930,1931, Page Brothers
Longview:  Gregg County Courthouse 1932, Voelcker and Dixon

Utah
Orderville: Valley School
Provo: Superintendent's Residence at the Utah State Hospital, 1934 (Colonial Revival/PWA Moderne)
Santaquin: Santaquin Junior High School

Washington
Seattle: William K. Nakamura Federal Courthouse, 1940, Gilbert Stanley Underwood

WPA Moderne
WPA Moderne has been used to describe restrained architecture at historic places such as the Administration Building for the City of Grand Forks at the Grand Forks Airport (built 1941-43) in North Dakota, the Municipal Auditorium and City Hall (Leoti, Kansas) (built 1939-42) in Kansas, and the Kearney National Guard Armory in Nebraska. (See :Category:WPA Moderne architecture). Relative to the Public Works Administration, which terminated in 1944, the Works Progress Administration program, terminated in 1943, focused on smaller, often rural, projects providing employment.

See also
 List of Art Deco architecture 
 List of Art Deco architecture in the United States
 Art Deco architecture of New York City
 
 Streamline Moderne architecture
 WPA Rustic architecture
 List of New Deal sculpture
 List of New Deal murals
 List of United States post office murals

References

Notes and citations

Bibliography

External links
 

 
 
 
American architectural styles
Art Deco architecture in the United States